The Watling Estate is in Burnt Oak, in the Edgware district of the London Borough of Barnet. It was one of twelve London County Council cottage estates built between the wars to provide "homes fit for heroes".

Location
In the 1850s, Burnt Oak referred to no more than a field on the eastern side of the Edgware Road (Watling Street). By the 1860s plans were in place to build three residential streets: North Street, East Street, and South Street. The area was generally known as Red Hill until the opening of Burnt Oak tube station on the Northern line of the London Underground on 27 October 1924. It was on farmland to the south-east of the community in Edgware Road, that London Transport constructed a new road, Watling Avenue, and London County Council built the Watling Estate housing estate. In September 1931 Jack Cohen opened his first Tesco store at 54 Watling Avenue, Burnt Oak.

History

The Housing of the Working Classes Act 1890 encouraged the London authority to improve the housing in their areas. It also gave them the power acquire land and to build tenements and houses (cottages). The First World War indirectly provided a new impetus, when the poor physical health and condition of many urban recruits to the army was noted with alarm. This led to a campaign known as 'Homes fit for Heroes'. In 1919 the Government, through The Addison Act (Housing Act 1919) the required councils to provide housing built to the Tudor Walters standards.  It helped them to do so through the provision of subsidies. These were then removed by the Geddes Axe of 1922, and partially restored by the Wheatley Act of 1924.

Thus LCC was actively looking for suitable land when the Northern Line was extended in 1934 opening up a new transport corridor. LCC quickly purchased  of farmland adjacent to the new Burnt Oak tube station. The plans were drawn up by the LCC's Chief Architect, George Forrest. The rest was for housing.

Design

Planning the estate
In 1912 Raymond Unwin, published a pamphlet Nothing gained by Overcrowding. These ideas influenced the Tudor Walters Report of 1918. The estate shows all the signs of the "garden city movement". Care was taken to exploit the undulating ground, offering vistas and long views. There are cul de sacs. The terraces are indeed short and stepped back at road corners to open up the space. Throughout the estate runs the Silk Stream, and the banks have been used to create parks and internal open-space.

Houses and flats

There were 4012 dwellings on the estate, Most were traditional brick; there were 252 'Atholl' steel and 464 timber-frame homes built as experiments. It was hoped that they would be cheaper and quicker to build. Most were larger family homes: there was a mix of parlour and non-parlour types. There were also around 320 flats, built in low-rise blocks.

The facilities
The main shopping parade on Watling Avenue was built in 1930.
The first school opened in 1928, the large Watling Central School in 1931.

Community
The initial tenants were selected by LCC. Like  other estates, they were a relatively well-off though overwhelmingly working-class population with small families. 20% were skilled manual, 20% transport workers and 10% clerical with wages between £3 and £4 a week. Almost half of the incomers were under 18.

The estate was seen as a threat by the older citizens of Edgware who dubbed it "Little Moscow". and likened the initiative to one of the "raw, red tentacles of that housing octopus, the London County Council".

Conservation area
The Watling Estate was made a conservation area in 2007.

See also
Downham Estate

References
Notes

Bibliography

 
 
 
 

 
  Quotes: Rubinstein, 1991, Just like the country.

Further reading

External links

Housing estates in the London Borough of Barnet
Districts of the London Borough of Barnet